Sandy Beach is a former resort village in the Canadian province of Saskatchewan within Census Division No. 6. It is now part of the District of Katepwa.

History 
Sandy Beach originally incorporated as a resort village in 1954. It, and the resort villages of Katepwa Beach and Katepwa South, amalgamated on July 24, 2004 to form the Resort Village of the District of Katepwa.

Demographics 

Government 
The former Resort Village of Sandy Beach has been governed by the District of Katepwa since the 2004 amalgamation. Sandy Beach is in Ward 1, which is represented by councillors Darren Cyca and Murdoch MacPherson. The District of Katepwa's mayor is Rick Pattison and its administrator is Gail E. Sloan.

See also 
List of communities in Saskatchewan
List of municipalities in Saskatchewan
List of resort villages in Saskatchewan

References 

Former resort villages in Saskatchewan
Unincorporated communities in Saskatchewan
Populated places disestablished in 2004
Abernethy No. 186, Saskatchewan
Division No. 6, Saskatchewan